Rhaebo hypomelas is a species of toad in the family Bufonidae. It is endemic to Colombia and known from the Chocó region in the departments of Antioquia, Chocó, Risaralda, Valle del Cauca, and Cauca, at elevations of  asl. There are also reports from Ecuador but these are not considered valid.
Its natural habitats are lowland tropical moist forests. It is a terrestrial species living in leaf litter near water. It is a rare species that is threatened by habitat loss.

References

hypomelas
Amphibians of Colombia
Amphibians described in 1913
Endemic fauna of Colombia
Taxonomy articles created by Polbot